Frederick II, also known as Frederick the Pious (1418–1478) was the Duke of Brunswick-Lüneburg and Prince of Lüneburg from 1434 to 1457 and from 1471 to 1478.

Life 
After the death of his father Bernard, Frederick ruled the Principality of Lüneburg jointly with his brother Otto. The highlights of their rule were a major expansion of Celle Castle and numerous reforms to improve the legal position of farmers vis-à-vis their landlords. After his brother died in 1446, Frederick ruled the principality on his own. In 1452 he had a monastery built on the Heylig Kreuz ("Holy Cross") and brought Franciscan friars to Celle. In 1457 he passed the government of the principality to his son, Bernard, and entered the monastery, but in 1471, after the death of his second son Otto V, he left monastic life again and held the reins of power for his 3-year old first grandchild Henry. Frederick was interred in the church of the Franciscan monastery that he had founded in Celle.

Descendants 
In 1437 Frederick II married Magdalene (1412–1454), daughter of Frederick I, Elector of Brandenburg, and had three children by her:
 Bernhard II (died 1464) married Mathilda of Holstein-Schauenburg (died 1468)
 Otto the Victorious (1439–1471) married Anne of Nassau-Siegen (1440/41–1514)
 Gottfried (1441-1465) never married
 Margaret (1442–1512) married Henry, Duke of Mecklenburg-Stargard (died 1466)

Ancestors

References 
 Geckler, Christa (1986). Die Celler Herzöge: Leben und Wirken 1371–1705. Celle: Georg Ströher. . .

External links 
The Welfs

Princes of Lüneburg
1418 births
1478 deaths
Middle House of Lüneburg